A Fazenda 14 is the fourteenth season of the Brazilian reality television series A Fazenda, which premiered Tuesday, September 13, 2022, at  (BRT / AMT) on RecordTV, following a sneak peek episode that aired on September 12.

Overview

Development
Adriane Galisteu returned for her second season as the main host, alongside Lucas Selfie as the show's online host and correspondent.

Like the previous seasons, the contestants moved into the Farm on Sunday, September 11, 2022, two days before the season premiere.

Contestants

The game

The Warehouse
On Day 2, four additional contestants entered the Warehouse where the public voted for one of them to move into the main House on Day 5.

Fire challenge
Each week, contestants (determined by a random draw) compete in the Fire challenge to win the Lamp power. The Lamp power entitles the holder two flames (black and green or red and yellow), which may unleash good or bad consequences on the nomination process, with the green/red flame power defined by the public through the R7.com website among two options.

The winner chooses a flame for himself and delegates which contestant holds the other. The Flame holder's choice is marked in bold.

Obligations

Farmer's ranch

Voting history

Notes

Ratings and reception

Brazilian ratings
All numbers are in points and provided by Kantar Ibope Media.

References

External links
 A Fazenda 14 on R7.com 

2022 Brazilian television seasons
A Fazenda